The  Washington Redskins season was the franchise's 44th season in the National Football League (NFL) and their 39th in Washington, D.C. The team failed to improve on their 10–4 record from 1974 and finished 8-6.

Offseason

NFL Draft

Roster

Regular season

Schedule

Season summary

Week 2

Week 6

Week 7

Source: Pro-Football-Reference.com

Week 8

Standings

Postseason
The Redskins did not qualify for the postseason in 1975.

Awards and records

Milestones

References

Washington
Washington Redskins seasons
Washington Redskins